Love Food Hate Waste is a campaign, launched by the Waste & Resources Action Programme in 2007, with the aim of reducing the amount of food waste in the United Kingdom. The campaign has been promoted and circulated by many green sites. The campaign claims to have already helped almost two million households reduce their food waste, amounting to savings of almost £300 million and stopping 137,000 tonnes of waste going being wasted. The campaign has now spread to Australia, New Zealand and Canada.

End of use-by date 
In relation to the Love Food Hate Waste campaign, UK minister Hilary Benn announced plans to end the use of use-by dates as he sees them as a major cause of food waste. There are plans to replace the use-by date with new technologies such as time-temperature-indicators.

See also
Food waste in the United Kingdom
Waste management in Australia

References

External links
Love Food Hate Waste
Love Food Hate Waste - Scotland
Love Food Hate Waste - New Zealand
Waste Aware Scotland
Love Food Hate Waste - Metro Vancouver

2007 establishments in the United Kingdom
Food waste in the United Kingdom
Waste minimisation